The third Arunachal Pradesh Legislative Assembly election was held in 1984.   Indian National Congress (INC) won 21 seats out of 30 seats, while the People's Party of Arunachal (PPA) won four seats and independent candidates won four seats. Gegong Apang was  sworn in as Chief Minister.

The election was held in 1,127 different polling stations and the average number of electors per polling station was 283. 28 men and 2 women were successful candidates.

Electors

Results

Elected Members

References

Arunachal Pradesh
State Assembly elections in Arunachal Pradesh
1980s in Arunachal Pradesh